Armido Torri (5 November 1938 – 23 January 2022) was an Italian rower. He competed in the men's eight event at the 1960 Summer Olympics. He died in Opera on 23 January 2022, at the age of 83.

References

External links

1938 births
2022 deaths
Italian male rowers
Olympic rowers of Italy
Rowers at the 1960 Summer Olympics
Sportspeople from the Province of Lecco